The Municipality of Erskineville was a local government area of Sydney, New South Wales, Australia. The municipality was proclaimed as the "Municipal District of Macdonald Town" on 23 May 1872 and, with an area of 0.8 square kilometres, was one of the smallest local government areas in Sydney and included the modern suburb of Erskineville, part of Eveleigh and the locality of Macdonaldtown. The council was amalgamated, along with most of its neighbours, with the City of Sydney to the north with the passing of the Local Government (Areas) Act 1948. From 1968 to 1982 and from 1989 to 2004, the area was part of the South Sydney councils, with the former Town Hall serving as its council chambers.

Council history and location
The municipality was proclaimed by the Administrator of the Government of New South Wales, Sir Alfred Stephen, on 23 May 1872, with the name of the Municipal District of Macdonald Town (but was variously known as the "Borough of Macdonald Town" or the "Municipality of Macdonaldtown"). On 19 July 1872, the first council, consisting of six aldermen in one electorate, was elected (Charles Brandling Henderson, Henry Knight, James Bryan, Alexander Swanson, William Irwin and James Heighington), with Henry Knight elected as the first mayor at the first meeting on 23 July 1872. Knight (1801–1887) was a prominent landowner, builder and brick-maker who had also served as an alderman for Kingston Ward on the first council of the Municipality of Newtown when it was created in February 1863, serving until 1866.

The council first met in a weatherboard cottage on Erskineville Road, which was replaced by a purpose-built Victorian style design Town Hall designed by architects, Drake and Walcott, who had also designed the Leichhardt Town Hall and were commissioned by the council in March 1889. Built by Thomas Johnson, of Ultimo, the hall was completed in 1890 and the council first met there in February 1890.

On 19 May 1884, a further proclamation divided the municipality into three wards: North Ward, Middle Ward and South Ward. On 27 March 1893 the Parliament of New South Wales passed the "Borough of Erskineville Naming Act, 1893", effecting the name change from Macdonaldtown to the "Borough of Erskineville". From 28 December 1906, following the passing of the Local Government Act, 1906, the council was again renamed as the "Municipality of Erskineville". With the area being a significant working-class and industrial area, from the late 1910s and 1920s the council was completely controlled by the Australian Labor Party. Non-Labour aldermen were not elected until the 1940s, when Lang Labor eventually took control of the council.

Later history

By the 1930s, with the announcement of the widening and realignment of Erskineville Road, the Victorian-era town hall was set to be demolished. As a consequence, Erskineville Council commissioned plans for a new town hall on a site adjacent to the old hall. In 1936, an initial design by Sydney Architect Lindsay Gordon Scott was accepted. This design was an ambitious one, including two stories and a 75-foot-high clock tower. This design however was found to be too expensive and grand for a small municipality in a primarily working-class area of Sydney and was revised to be the current design of a single storey building without the tower in a similar red brick Georgian revival style. On 1 December 1937, the Mayor of the council, Alderman J. W. Elliott, laid the foundation stone and nearly year later, on 26 November 1938, the Secretary for Public Works and Minister for Local Government, Eric Spooner MLA, officially opened Erskineville Town Hall with the Mayor at that time, Alderman Nicholas McGuinness.

By the end of the Second World War, the NSW Government had realised that its ideas of infrastructure expansion could not be effected by the present system of the mostly-poor inner-city municipal councils and the Minister for Local Government, Joseph Cahill, passed a bill in 1948 that abolished a significant number of those councils. Under the Local Government (Areas) Act 1948, Erskineville Municipal Council was merged with the larger neighbouring City of Sydney.

Mayors

Town Clerks

References

Erskineville
Erskineville
Erskineville
Erskineville
Inner West